Kentville is a rural locality in the Lockyer Valley Region, Queensland, Australia. In the  Kentville had a population of 100 people.

Geography 
Kentville is flat freehold farming land, used for crops and grazing, approximately 70 metres above sea level. Lockyer Creek forms its south-west boundary. In the east of the locality is the One Mile Lagoon.

The Forest Hill Fernvale Road passes through the south-east of the locality.

History 
The One Mile Lagoon Provisional School opened on 7 October 1907, becoming One Mile Lagoon State School on 1 January 1909. In 1944 it was renamed Kentville State School.

In August 1908, the Australian Government approved the establishment of a receiving office One Mile Lagoon which was renamed Kentville in September 1909. It was upgraded to a post office on 1 July 1927. It closed on 1 April 1970.

In the  Kentville had a population of 100 people.

Education 
Kentville State School is a government primary (Prep-6) school for boys and girls at 4 Turpin Road. In 2016, the school had an enrolment of 31 students with three teachers and eight non-teaching staff (three full-time equivalent). In 2018, the school had an enrolment of 44 students with 5 teachers (3 full-time equivalent) and 9 non-teaching staff (4 full-time equivalent).

References

External links 
 

Lockyer Valley Region
Localities in Queensland